Galeottia is a genus of flowering plants from the orchid family, Orchidaceae. It is native to South America, Central America and southern Mexico.

Galeottia acuminata (C.Schweinf.) Dressler & Christenson
Galeottia antioquiana (Kraenzl.) Dressler & Christenson
Galeottia burkei (Rchb.f.) Dressler & Christenson
Galeottia ciliata (C.Morel) Dressler & Christenson
Galeottia colombiana (Garay) Dressler & Christenson
Galeottia fimbriata (Linden & Rchb.f.) Schltr.
Galeottia grandiflora A.Rich.
Galeottia jorisiana (Rolfe) Schltr.
Galeottia marginata (Garay) Dressler & Christenson
Galeottia negrensis Schltr.
Galeottia peruviana D.E.Benn. & Christenson
Galeottia prainiana (Rolfe) Dressler & Christenson

See also
 List of Orchidaceae genera

References

  (1845) Annales des Sciences Naturelles; Botanique, sér. 3 3: 25.
 . Handbuch der Orchideen-Namen. Dictionary of Orchid Names. Dizionario dei nomi delle orchidee. Ulmer, Stuttgart
  (2009) Epidendroideae (Part two). Genera Orchidacearum 5: 498 ff. Oxford University Press.

External links

Zygopetalinae genera
Zygopetalinae